Mefite may refer to:

Mefite, alternative name for Mefitis, goddess of foul-smelling gasses from the earth
A member of MetaFilter, a community weblog
Mefite of Rocca San Felice, archaeological site in Rocca San Felice